Jesper Henriksen (in some sources Jesper Henrichsen) ( - before 1493) belonged to the Danish nobility.

References

1425 births
1493 deaths
Danish nobility
Rectors of the University of Copenhagen